Gogita's New Life is a 2016 Georgian documentary film directed by Levan Koguashvili. It was screened in the  Feature-Length Documentary section at the International Documentary Film Festival Amsterdam.

Synopsis
The film is about a middle-aged man, who returns to a normal life, after 14 years in prison and meets a girl by the internet - Maka, who lives with her mother in their farm. Her job is baking cakes and Gogita soon find outs that she is the prettiest woman in the world.

Production
Levan Koguashvili started to develop the film idea in early 2012. He was interested in conditions of prisons in Georgian jails, but it was difficult to make a film into the prison. "The only way to get permission to film inside was through the churches in the jails, and Gogita was one of the guys coming to the church in the jail." Levan did a pause and made his second fiction feature - Blind Dates. After its success he continued working on this documentary. "I became part of their relationship", said the director about his closeness to the film's protagonists - Gogita and Maka.

References

External links
 

2016 films
2016 documentary films
Documentary films from Georgia (country)
2010s Georgian-language films